Leonard Bisaku (born 22 October 1974) is a Croatian retired football midfielder who last played for the Columbus Crew in Major League Soccer.

Club career
He spent most of his professional career playing in Croatia with clubs including, Hajduk Split and NK Rijeka.

At age 31, he signed with the Crew on April 4, 2006, and was released late in the season.

Bisaku belonged to the Kosovar jeweller family.

He is now a football agent.

References

External links
Profile at 1hnl.net

Bisaku was being appointed to Columbus Crew

1974 births
Living people
Footballers from Zagreb
Croatian people of Kosovan descent
Croatian people of Albanian descent
Association football midfielders
Croatian footballers
HNK Hajduk Split players
HNK Cibalia players
NK Slaven Belupo players
NK Hrvatski Dragovoljac players
Pohang Steelers players
Seongnam FC players
HNK Rijeka players
HŠK Posušje players
Columbus Crew players
Croatian Football League players
Premier League of Bosnia and Herzegovina players
Major League Soccer players
Croatian expatriate footballers
Expatriate footballers in South Korea
Croatian expatriate sportspeople in South Korea
Expatriate footballers in Bosnia and Herzegovina
Croatian expatriate sportspeople in Bosnia and Herzegovina
Expatriate soccer players in the United States
Croatian expatriate sportspeople in the United States